Idlewild is a 2006 American musical film written and directed by Bryan Barber. The film stars André 3000 and Big Boi of the hip hop duo Outkast, and the film features musical numbers that were written, produced and chiefly performed by the group. Idlewild contrasts the group's hip-hop, funk, and soul sound against a story based on a juke joint in the fictional Depression-era town of Idlewild, Georgia in 1935.

Distributed by Universal Pictures, the film is an HBO Films co-production alongside Mosaic Media Group and Forensic Films. It features an ensemble cast including Terrence Howard, Paula Jai Parker, Paula Patton, Cicely Tyson, Ben Vereen, Patti LaBelle, Ving Rhames, Macy Gray, Faizon Love, Bruce Bruce, Malinda Williams, Jackie Long and Bill Nunn. Idlewild received mixed reviews from critics and grossed $12 million worldwide. It was nominated for six Black Reel Awards.

Plot summary 

The film follows Percival and Rooster, who have been close friends since childhood. In 1935, Percival works at his father Percy Senior's morgue during the day and plays piano at a local club called Church at night. Rooster becomes a singer at the club and a bootlegger; he also marries Zora, with whom he has five children.

On a night Rooster is performing, gangsters Spats, Trumpy, Ace, and Rose attend to talk about a deal they have with the club. Angel Davenport, a singer from St. Louis who has a contract with the club, arrives backstage. Angel is actually Sally B. Shelley, an aspiring singer who stole the contract from the real Davenport.

Rooster and Rose have sex in a car in a warehouse. When they hear people coming into the building, Rose jumps out of the car, gets dressed, and confronts Spats, Trumpy and Ace, who have just arrived. She then runs off, and Trumpy kills Spats and Ace to get the business for himself.

Rooster runs into Trumpy while taking his family shopping, and Trumpy explains that the debt owed by Ace is now Rooster's problem. He has to come up with this money by selling liquor at Church bought from Trumpy's "suppliers." Rooster goes to Rose's house to warn her, but she is already packed up and ready to leave. Rose drives away in a taxi, being watched by one of Trumpy's henchmen.

Meanwhile, Rooster begins to have more problems at the club and forces Angel to sing. After she has an attack of stage fright, Percival calms her and gives her a song that he wrote. The song is a hit, Angel becomes an overnight star, and she and Percival fall in love.

Roosters's wife Zora grows tired of his cheating and moves with their children to her mother's house. Angel gets a record deal in Chicago and asks Percival to go with her, but he reluctantly declines, as he feels obligated to his father. When Angel finds out that Percival knows who she really is, she pledges her love to him and persuades him to go to Chicago.

Rooster devises a plan to buy liquor from bootlegger GW and his partner. One day, as Rooster is making his rounds to pick up hooch from GW, he sees a car on the road that seems to be stuck. He approaches the car and sees an old woman, Mother Hopkins, and her grandchildren. Rooster gives them all the money he has, and Mother Hopkins tells Rooster that he is an angel, giving him a bible before he leaves. Rooster walks into the abandoned house of the two bootleggers and sees that Trumpy's henchmen have beaten up GW and killed his partner.

Rooster is caught and brought to Trumpy, and GW is shot to death. During a fight between Rooster and Trumpy's henchmen, a shot at Rooster is blocked by the bible in his jacket. After Rooster escapes, Trumpy follows him to the club, where Angel and Percival have also decided to stop before going to Chicago. Rooster and Trumpy fight and, just as he is about to shoot Rooster, Percival shoots and kills Trumpy. Percival then notices that Angel has been shot and runs to her aid, though she dies shortly afterward.

A grieving Percival prepares Angel for her burial, dressing her in a wedding gown and slipping a ring on her finger. Afterward, he attempts to commit suicide by hanging himself in his room, but is interrupted when Rooster rings the doorbell. Percival is consoled and gives Angel's Chicago bound-ticket to Rooster, who reunites with his wife and children. Percival then begins to make records and tour in clubs throughout America, to great success.

The film ends with pictures of Percival and Angel, hung next to a picture of Percival's mother in her coffin.

Cast
 André 3000 as Percival "Percy" Jenkins Jr.
 Big Boi as "Rooster"
Bobb'e J. Thompson as Young "Rooster"
 Paula Patton as Angel Davenport / Sally B. Shelly
 Terrence Howard as "Trumpy" / Wilbert
 Faizon Love as "Sunshine Ace"
 Malinda Williams as Zora
 Cicely Tyson as Mother Hopkins
 Jackie Long as Monk
 Macy Gray as "Taffy"
 Ben Vereen as Percival Jenkins Sr.
 Paula Jai Parker as Rose
 Patti LaBelle as The Real Angel Davenport
 Ving Rhames as "Spats"
 Karen Dyer as Eva, The Fire Diva
 Bill Nunn as G.W.
 Fonzworth Bentley as The Flask (voice)

Soundtrack
The musical numbers are written and performed by OutKast, with other featured performances by Macy Gray and Debra Killings, who performed the singing voice of Patton's character. The hip hop, funk, and soul stylings of the song score are intentionally anachronistic, a choice made to complement the film being set in 1935. Elements of 1930s-era blues and jazz music are however featured prominently in many of the musical numbers. The film's dance numbers, choreographed by Hinton Battle, also feature many period dances, primarily the Lindy Hop and jitterbug.

Most of the songs in Idlewild had already been featured on the OutKast albums Big Boi and Dre Present...OutKast and Speakerboxxx/The Love Below, essentially making it a jukebox musical. Seven of the songs from the film, along with several unreleased songs, were released by LaFace Records as an OutKast album entitled Idlewild at the time of the film's release.

Musical numbers

Reception
Idlewild received mixed reviews from critics. , the film holds a 47% approval rating on Rotten Tomatoes, based on 130 reviews with an average rating of 5.6/10. The website's critics consensus reads: "Idlewild has some truly breathtaking moments, but borrows too heavily from other similar movies, and the disjointed script is not worthy of talents involved." Peter Travers of Rolling Stone said the film "can't decide if it's about bullets, booze, broads or the sound of hip-hop that the film strenuously tries to marry to the 1930s". Writing for Film Journal International, Frank Lovece wrote "Seemingly meant as an African-American Moulin Rouge, this visual blast of an homage to classic Hollywood musicals settles in as an odd hybrid, neither fish nor fowl. Nor foul, either, though not great — and ultimately, more idle than wild". Teresa Wiltz of The Washington Post likewise acknowledged director Bryan Barber's inventiveness, saying that, "For all its shortcomings, Idlewild also has something that few films can pull off: Moments of such pure cinematic fabulousness, breathtaking dance sequences and idiosyncratic flourishes that we are more than willing to forgive it for all its sins".

The film grossed $12,571,185 on a $10 million budget.

Awards and nominations

See also
Idlewild (Outkast album)

References

External links 
 
 
 

2006 films
2006 crime drama films
2006 directorial debut films
2000s American films
2000s English-language films
2000s musical drama films
African-American drama films
African-American musical films
American crime drama films
American musical drama films
Atlas Entertainment films
Films about music and musicians
Films about organized crime in the United States
Films scored by John Debney
Films set in the 1920s
Films set in 1935
Films set in Georgia (U.S. state)
Films shot in California
Films shot in North Carolina
HBO Films films
Jukebox musical films
Universal Pictures films